Rosemary O'Leary is the Edwin O. Stene Distinguished Professor of Public Administration at the University of Kansas. Her research focuses on public management, collaboration, conflict resolution, environmental and natural resources management, and public law.

Career 
Rosemary O'Leary was appointed the Edwin O. Stene Distinguished Professor of Public Administration at the University of Kansas in 2013, following a 24 year career at the Maxwell School of Citizenship and Public Affairs of Syracuse University (Phanstiel Distinguished Chair in Strategic Management and Leadership) and the School of Public and Environmental Affairs at Indiana University-Bloomington (Professor). O'Leary is the author or editor of 13 books and more than 140 articles and book chapters on public management. She has won 13 national research awards and 2 international research awards, including 4 best books awards. She is the winner of 11 teaching awards, two if them national.  She is also the only person to win four Network of Schools of Public Policy, Affairs and Administration awards for Best Dissertation (1989), Excellence in Teaching (1996), Distinguished Research (2004), and Excellence in Doctoral Education (2021). O’Leary has worked in Hong Kong, China, Malaysia, the Philippines, New Zealand, India, and the US. She was President of the Public Management Research Association, 2017-2019.  In 2019, the International Research Society for Public Management (IRSPM) established the annual "Rosemary O'Leary Prize for Outstanding Scholarship on Women in Public Administration."

Selected Awards and Honors 
 Provan Award (for outstanding contributions to empirical theory) given by the Academy of Management Public and Nonprofit Division, 2017.
 Frederickson Award (for lifetime achievement and continuous contributions to public management research over an extended career) given by the Public Management Research Association, 2017.
 Routledge Award (for “outstanding contribution to public management research”) given by the  International Research Society for Public Management (IRSPM), 2017.
 John Gaus Award (for a “lifetime of exemplary scholarship in the joint tradition of political science and public administration”) given by the American Political Science Association, 2016.
 Dwight Waldo Award (for “distinguished contributions to the professional literature of public administration and in recognition of a distinguished career as author, educator, and public administrator”), given by the American Society for Public Administration, 2014.
Distinguished Research Award ("for published work that has had a substantial impact on the thought and understanding of public administration"), given jointly by the Network of Schools of Public Policy, Affairs and Administration and the American Society for Public Administration, 2004.
 Co-Author of “One of 75 Most Influential Articles since 1940” Commendation from Public Administration Review (with L. Bingham and T. Nabatchi), 2014, for "The New Governance: Practices and Processes for Stakeholder and Citizen Participation in the Work  of Government," Public Administration Review, vol. 665, no. 5, pp. 547–558, 2005.
 Charles H. Levine Memorial Award (for “excellence in public administration research, teaching, and service to the broader community”), American Society for Public Administration and the National Association of Schools of Public Affairs and Administration, 2007.
 NASA Public Service Medal (for “distinguished leadership, dedication and commitment” as a member of the NASA Return to Flight Task Group assembled in response to the Columbia space shuttle accident), 2005.
 Elected Fellow, U.S. National Academy of Public Administration, 1998.

Selected publications
The Ethics of Dissent: Managing Guerrilla Government, 3rd edition. Washington D.C.: Congressional Quarterly Press (2020).
Winner of the "Best Book in Public and Non-Profit Management" Award, given by the Academy of Management, 2021
Coined the term "guerrilla government" to describe public servants who clandestinely disobey the wishes of their superiors in order to do what they think is right (e.g., Edward Snowden, Chelsea Manning).
The ideas in this book have been presented in 8 countries.
Retrofitting Collaboration Into the New Public Management (with E. Eppel, Cambridge University Press 2021)
Leading in Peach: Leadership Through Different Eyes (with R. Hilton, Routledge 2018)
Winner of the Rita Mae Kelly Distinguished Research award for "Research Contributions to Gender-Related Issues Significant to Women's Role in Public Administration and Make an Impact Through Research on Women's Lives" given by the American Society of Public Administration (ASPA), 2019
Environmental Governance Reconsidered (with R. Durant, D. Fiorino, and P.Weiland, MIT Press 2017)
Public Administration and Law, 3rd edition. CRC Press (2010). Translated into Chinese.
Managing For the Environment (with R. Durant, D. Fiorino, P. Weiland). Jossey-Bass, (1999).
 Winner of the “Best Book in Public and Non-Profit Management” Award, given by the  Academy of Management, 2000.
 Winner of the “Best Book in Environmental and Natural Resources Administration” Award, given by the American Society for Public Administration, 1999.
 Collaboration Across Boundaries: Insights and Tips from Federal Senior Executives (with C.Gerard). IBM Center for the Business of Government, (2012).
 A Manager’s Guide to Resolving Conflicts in Collaborative Network (with L.B.Bingham). IBM Center for the Business of Government, (2007).
 “Do Shocks Change Organizations?  The Case of NASA” (with A.K.Donahue).Journal of Public Administration Research and Theory (lead article), 22, 395-425 (2012).
 “The Skill Set of the Successful Collaborator” (with Y.Choi and C.Gerard).  Public Administration Review, 72 (S1) 70-83 (2012).
 “Collaborative Public Management:  Where Have We Been and Where Are We Going?" (with N.Vij). American Review of Public Administration,  42, 507-522 (2012).
 “Guerrilla Employees: Should Managers Nurture, Tolerate, or Terminate Them?” Public Administration Review, 70 (1) 8 – 18 (January/February 2010).

Notable Experience 
 Creator and coordinator of the Minnowbrook III conference (2008) which assessed the future of public administration around the world.
 Elected member of the National Academy of Public Administration.
 Senior Fulbright scholar in Malaysia and in the Philippines.
 Ian Axford Public Policy Scholar in New Zealand (2014).
 Member of the NASA’s Return to Flight Task Group assembled in response to the Columbia space shuttle accident (2003-2005).
 Served as a consultant to:
 U.S. Office of Personnel Management and Federal Executive Institute
 U.S. Council on Environmental Quality
 U.S. Department of Interior
 U.S. Environmental Protection Agency
 U.S. Geological Survey
 U.S. National Aeronautics and Space Administration
 International City/County Management Association
 National Academy of Sciences
 National Science Foundation
 New York State Department of Environmental Conservation
 Indiana Department of Environmental Management
 U.S. Institute for Environmental Conflict Resolution
 LMI Consulting
Selected academic leadership positions:
Director, School of Public Affairs & Administration, University of Kansas, 2017-2019
Executive Committee and Board of Directors, University of Kansas Center for Research, Inc (KUCR), 2015-2019.
Senior Administrative Fellow, University of Kansas 2015-2016
Co-Director, Program for the Advancement of Research in Conflict and Collaboration (Institute Director - PARCC), Maxwell School of Syracuse University 2004-2009
Co-Founder, E-PARCC: Free, open-source online cases and simulations on collaboration 2004
Co-Founder, Collaborative Governance Initiative, Maxwell School of Syracuse University 2004
Interim Director, Campbell Institute, Syracuse University, 2000-2001
Co-Director, Indiana Conflict Resolution Institute, 1997–1998
Director, Ph.D. Program, University of Kansas, 2013-2014
Director, Ph.D Program, Maxwell School of Syracuse University, 2001-2004
Chair, Environmental Administration Section, American Society for Public Administration 1995
Chair, Public Administration Section, American Political Science Association 1994

References

University of Kansas faculty
Syracuse University faculty
Year of birth missing (living people)
Living people
Public administration scholars
Environmental social scientists
American women political scientists
American political scientists
American women academics
21st-century American women